Ejby is a small railway town in Middelfart Municipality. It lies between Odense station and Middelfart station, on the island of Funen, Region of Southern Denmark, Denmark. It has a population of 2,140 (1 January 2022).

Until 1 January 2007, Ejby was the municipal seat of the former Ejby Municipality.

References

Cities and towns in the Region of Southern Denmark
Middelfart Municipality
Populated places in Funen